Methylephedrine may refer to:

 N-Methylephedrine
 4-Methylephedrine